Cannington Lake, also known as Cannington Lake Resort, is a hamlet within the Rural Municipality of Wawken No. 93, Saskatchewan, Canada. Listed as a designated place by Statistics Canada, the hamlet had a population of 0 in the Canada 2011 Census.

The resort is on the north-eastern shore of the lake and has over 20 lots owned, with six occupied cabins. The 2016 Canada Census does not list a population for Cannington Lake, only for the RM of Moose Mountain, which was 492 in 2016.

It was once a popular resort as the population would grow in the summer months. It was home to several powered and unpowered campsites, several BBQ areas, two boat launches, a beach, several rentable cabins, a miniature golf course, and other services. Over the years the lake water levels declined severely due to beaver damming, resulting in many of the residents moving their cabins away. Other nearby lakes, such as White Bear (Carlyle) Lake and Kenosee Lake have had similar issues with beaver dams. The lake levels have been on the rise in recent years due to beaver control measures. This may rejuvenate the area into a summer retreat once again.

Demographics

The lake

Cannington Lake is an elevated lake situated in a Boreal Forest south-east of Moose Mountain Provincial Park on the eastern edge of the Moose Mountain Upland. It is located at 49°46′0″N, 102°10′2″W, has a surface area of 146.5 hectares, and a shoreline of 9.5 kilometres.

The western half of the lake is on the White Bear First Nation. A few kilometers to the east is Cannington Manor Provincial Park. Carlyle is to the south-west and is the closest town.

The lake is excellent for canoeing and kayaking as it is not too large and rarely has strong winds. There is also a 6 km long nature path about the lake that goes by five ponds.

See also
List of lakes of Saskatchewan
List of communities in Saskatchewan
Tourism in Saskatchewan

References

External links

Wawken No. 93, Saskatchewan
Former designated places in Saskatchewan
Organized hamlets in Saskatchewan
Division No. 1, Saskatchewan
Lakes of Saskatchewan